Carl Shapiro (born 20 March 1955) is an American economist and academic who serves as the Transamerica Professor of Business Strategy at the University of California, Berkeley's Haas School of Business. He is the co-author, along with Hal Varian of Information Rules: A Strategic Guide to the Network Economy, published by the Harvard Business School Press. On February 23, 2011, The Wall Street Journal reported that President Barack Obama intended to nominate Shapiro to his Council of Economic Advisers.

Shapiro served as Deputy Assistant Attorney General for Economics in the Antitrust Division of the U.S. Department of Justice (1995–1996). He is a Senior Consultant with Charles River Associates and has consulted extensively for a wide range of private clients as well as for the U.S. Department of Justice and the Federal Trade Commission.

Shapiro was again the Deputy Assistant Attorney General for Economics of the Antitrust division of the Justice Department from 2009 to 2011.

Shapiro holds a BS in mathematics and a BS in economics from the Massachusetts Institute of Technology, an MA in mathematics from the University of California, Berkeley and a PhD in economics from the Massachusetts Institute of Technology.

He also coined the term essential patent to cover a patent that was required to practice a given industry standard.

Publications
 Information Rules (Harvard Business Press 1999; co-authored with Hal R. Varian)

References

External links
 Berkeley Haas Profile
 FT Interview with Carl Shapiro and Hal Varian
 Scientific publications

1955 births
Living people
21st-century American economists
Haas School of Business faculty
Princeton University faculty
Massachusetts Institute of Technology School of Science alumni
University of California, Berkeley alumni
United States Council of Economic Advisers
United States Department of Justice officials
Sloan Research Fellows
Fellows of the Econometric Society